Thymen Arensman (born 4 December 1999) is a Dutch cyclist, who currently rides for UCI WorldTeam .

Major results

Cyclo-cross

2015–2016
 Junior Superprestige
3rd Spa-Francorchamps
2016–2017
 1st  National Junior Championships
 UCI Junior World Cup
1st Heusden-Zolder
 3rd Overall Junior Superprestige
2nd Zonhoven
2nd Gavere
2nd Hoogstraten
3rd Gieten
3rd Diegem
 Junior Brico Cross
2nd Geraardsbergen
 Junior DVV Trophy
3rd Baal
2017–2018
 3rd National Under-23 Championships
2018–2019
 Under-23 DVV Trophy
1st Koppenberg

Road

2017
 2nd Time trial, National Junior Championships
 2nd Overall Oberösterreich Juniorenrundfahrt
1st Stage 3
 3rd Overall Internationale Niedersachsen-Rundfahrt
 8th Overall Trofeo Karlsberg
2018
 2nd Overall Tour de l'Avenir
 3rd Paris–Roubaix Espoirs
2021
 1st  Young rider classification, Tour de Romandie
 7th Overall Giro di Sicilia
2022
 2nd Overall Tour de Pologne
1st Stage 6 (ITT)
 3rd Overall Tour of the Alps
1st  Young rider classification
 6th Overall Vuelta a España
1st Stage 15
 6th Overall Tirreno–Adriatico

Grand Tour general classification results timeline

References

External links

1999 births
Cyclists from Gelderland
Cyclo-cross cyclists
Dutch Vuelta a España stage winners
Dutch male cyclists
Living people
People from Geldermalsen